Jakob Känzig (born 7 May 1893; date of death unknown) was a Swiss footballer who played for FC Basel. He played mainly in the position as  midfielder, but also as defender.

Between the years 1911 and 1922 Känzig played a total of 101 games for Basel, scoring one single goal. 48 of these games were in the Swiss Serie A and 53 were friendly games. He scored his only goal in the test game as Basel played away against SC Victoria Hamburg on 1 April 1922. The game ended in a 2–2 draw.

Sources and References
 Rotblau: Jahrbuch Saison 2017/2018. Publisher: FC Basel Marketing AG. 
 Die ersten 125 Jahre. Publisher: Josef Zindel im Friedrich Reinhardt Verlag, Basel. 
 Verein "Basler Fussballarchiv" Homepage

FC Basel players
Swiss men's footballers
Association football defenders
Association football midfielders
1893 births